The University of York (abbreviated as  or York for post-nominals) is a collegiate  research university, located in the city of York, England. Established in 1963, the university has expanded to more than thirty departments and centres, covering a wide range of subjects.

The original campus, Campus West, incorporates the York Science Park and the National Science Learning Centre, and its wildlife, campus lakes and greenery are prominent. In May 2007 the university was granted permission to build an extension to its main campus, on arable land just east of the nearby village of Heslington. The second campus, Campus East, opened in 2009 and now hosts five colleges and three departments as well as conference spaces, a sports village and a business start-up 'incubator'. The institution also leases King's Manor in York city centre. The university had a total income of £458.8 million in 2021-22 of which £79.7 million was from research grants and contracts, with an expenditure of £542.2 million.

York was one of the first of the plate glass universities established in the 1960s, and runs a distinctive collegiate system with 11 colleges as of 2022. The eleventh college, David Kato, opened in 2022. In 2012, York joined the Russell Group of research-intensive British universities.

History

Origins
The first petition for the establishment of a university in York was presented to James I in 1617. In 1641, a second petition was drawn up but was not delivered due to the English Civil War in 1642. A third petition was created in 1647 but was rejected by Parliament. In the 1820s there were discussions about the founding of a university in York, but this did not come to fruition due to the founding of Durham University in 1832. In 1903, F. J. Munby and the Yorkshire Philosophical Society, among others, proposed a "Victoria University of Yorkshire".

Oliver Sheldon a director of Rowntree's and co-founder of York Civic Trust, was a driving force behind the campaign to found the university.

Establishment
Morrell and the history of the foundations. In 1963 the university opened with 216 undergraduates, 14 postgraduates, and 28 academic and administrative staff. The university started with six departments: Economics, Education, English, History, Mathematics, Politics. At the time, the university consisted of three buildings, principally the historic King's Manor in the city centre and Heslington Hall, which has Tudor foundations and is in the village of Heslington on the edge of York. A year later, work began on purpose-built structures on the Heslington Campus, which now forms the main part of the university.

Baron James of Rusholme, the university's first Vice-Chancellor, said of the University of York that "it must be collegiate in character, that it must deliberately seek to limit the number of subjects and that much of the teaching must be done via tutorials and seminars". Due to the influence of Graeme Moodie, founding head of the Politics Department, students are involved in the governance of the university at all levels, and his model has since been widely adopted.

York's first two Colleges, Derwent and Langwith, were founded in 1965, as was the University of York Library. These were the first residential colleges. They were followed by Alcuin and Vanbrugh in 1967 and Goodricke in 1968. In 1972 this was followed by Wentworth College.

The university was noted for its inventive approach to teaching. It was known for its early adoption of joint honours degrees which were often very broad such as history and biology. It also took an innovative approach to social science introducing a five-year-long degree in the subject.

Expansion
After 1972 the construction of Colleges ceased until 1990 with the foundation of James College. Initially James was intended to be a postgraduate only college. However, the university began to expand rapidly, almost doubling in size from 4,300 to 8,500 students. In 1993, therefore it was decided that the college should become open to undergraduates. The expansion of student numbers also resulted in the creation of more accommodation by the university, which was named 'Halifax Court'; the members of Halifax Court were members of other colleges, however, soon formed their own Junior Common Room. In 2002, Halifax Court was made a full college of the university and was renamed Halifax College.

In 2003, the university set out plans to create a campus for 5,000 additional students, and to introduce a number of new subjects such as Law and

Dentistry. For a number of years, the university's expansion plans were limited by planning restrictions. The City of York planning conditions stipulate that only 20% of the land area may be built upon, and the original campus was at full capacity.

In 2004, plans were finalised for a 117 hectare extension to the campus, initially called Heslington East, designed to mirror the existing Heslington West campus. They are now known as Campus East and Campus West. The plans set out that the new campus would be built on arable land between Grimston Bar park and ride car park and Heslington village. The land was removed from the green belt especially for the purpose of extending the university. After a lengthy consultation and a public inquiry into the proposals in 2006, the Secretary of State for Communities and Local Government gave the go-ahead in May 2007. In May 2008 the City of York planners approved the design for the residential college, Goodricke. In The Press on 28 July 2008, Shepherd Construction was named as the preferred contractor for the Goodricke College buildings. The proposal included landscaping the whole area, constructing a lake with marsh borders, planting light woodland and many specimen trees, and maximising biodiversity.

Construction began in 2008, with the first buildings, including Goodricke college, coming into use in October 2009. It was decided that rather than create a new college that an existing college should be moved. Goodricke College was selected for this and moved onto the new campus in 2009 with James taking over its building on Campus West. Goodricke was officially opened by the Duke of York in April 2010. In 2012 the same process took place with Langwith moving to Campus East and Derwent taking over its previous buildings. In 2014 Campus East saw the establishment of the ninth college, named Constantine College after the Roman emperor Constantine the Great, who was proclaimed Augustus in York in 306 AD.

Work began in December 2019 to build two new colleges on Campus East. These will comprise around 1,400 new student bedrooms as well as new social spaces. The university says that "development has been designed to optimise the beautiful landscape and will be built with respect for the existing ecological diversity around the lake".

Campus

Campus West

In 1964, work began on the campus facilities in the grounds of Heslington Hall. The marshy land was drained, the winding lake which dominates the campus was built, and the area was landscaped. The original buildings were designed by architects Sir Andrew Derbyshire and Sir Stirrat Johnson-Marshall, with input also from the Vice-Chancellor Lord James, Professor Patrick Nuttgens and the Registrar John West-Taylor. The new structures were assembled using the CLASP system of prefabricated construction, hence York's inclusion among the so-called plate glass universities. The buildings are connected by numerous covered walkways and bridges. Most of the university's arts departments occupy premises in the college buildings, while many of the science departments have their own buildings.

A landmark building is Central Hall, a half-octagonal concert hall used for convocations and examinations, as well as theatrical and musical performances.  It is a Grade II listed building, as is the West campus landscape. It has played host to The Wailers, George Melly, Soft Machine, Pink Floyd, and Paul McCartney. Performances by big-name acts have been rarer at the university following a 1985 The Boomtown Rats concert, during which the cover of the orchestra pit was damaged. A ban on pop performances, and in particular dancing, in Central Hall was imposed by the university, although it has occasionally been relaxed. Central Hall is still used for classical concerts and since a rock concert was held there on 13 March 2010 it has been available again for full booking. Public concerts are regularly held in the music department's Sir Jack Lyons Concert Hall, the Arthur Sykes Rymer Auditorium and in some of the colleges. The Raymond Burton Library was also recently nominated for a SCONUL Design award.
The campus lake is the largest plastic-bottomed lake in Europe. The decision by Sir Andrew Derbyshire and Stirrat Johnson-Marshall to give the university a lake had two motivations: one, to give the university a distinct image and identity while also creating areas to foster community; and two, more practically to create a drainage basin for the relatively flat agricultural site as it was feared the construction of the new buildings would increase the risk of flooding. The lake has attracted a large population of wild and semi-wild waterfowl, including greylag, Canada, barnacle and snow geese, coots, moorhens and large numbers of ducks, including mallards, tufted duck, and common pochards. There is also a growing population of black swans and a few great crested grebe. Grey herons have also been sighted on the lake. The southern end of the lake has been established as a bird sanctuary. Fishing is permitted in season, on purchase of a licence.

Other parts of the campus support a large rabbit population. On at least one occasion, students have been cautioned by the university for hunting rabbits.

The Campus West has both indoor and outdoor sports facilities, including an all-weather AstroTurf pitch and County standard cricket pitch. A large, tent-like structure allows for indoor sport, gymnastics and dance.

In 2013 it was reported that the university was planning a major redevelopment of Campus West which would also result in the creation of a tenth college.

Heslington Hall 

Heslington Hall is a Grade II* listed rebuilt manor house consisting of a central nine-bay two-storey block with attics and two two-storey wings at each end. It is built of brick in English bond with sandstone ashlar dressings. The original Manor house was constructed in 1568 for Sir Thomas Eynns, the Secretary and Keeper of the Seal to the Council of the North; and his wife Elizabeth.

At the outbreak of the Second World War, the house was vacated by the family, allowing it to be taken over by the Royal Air Force as the headquarters of No. 4 Group RAF, part of RAF Bomber Command. The hall was not re-occupied by the family after the war.  In 1955 the hall was given Grade II* listed building status. When the university was founded, Sir Bernard Feilden supervised its conversion into the administrative headquarters of the university. The hall and University were at that time in the East Riding of Yorkshire although they are now part of the City of York.

King's Manor

For many years from 1966, the King's Manor housed the Institute of Advanced Architectural Studies (IoAAS). The IoAAS was a postgraduate institute primarily specialising in providing mid-career education for architects and others. In particular, it became well known for its one-year Diploma Course in Conservation Studies. It is now home to the Archaeology, Medieval Studies and Eighteenth Century Studies departments, and is regularly used by other related departments such as History. It has a public restaurant and is used for art displays.

Not far from the King's Manor is the Minster Library, in Dean's Park. Students and staff of the university are able to use the Minster Library, which shares staff and cataloguing with the main university library, and holds the huge collection of early books belonging to the Dean and Chapter of York Minster.

Campus East

Several departments have purpose-built facilities on Campus East, including Law and the York Management School. In October 2010, several departments moved into new facilities on Campus East including the Department of Theatre, Film and Television and the Department of Computer Science.

Campus East also includes the York Sports Village and a new purpose built £1.1 million Olympic-sized outdoor velodrome, the only one in Yorkshire or the North East of England.

Science Park and on-campus organisations
Next door to the university on the York Science Park are organisations including the Higher Education Academy, the Digital Preservation Coalition, the National Non-Food Crops Centre, the York Neuroimaging Centre, the York JEOL Nanocentre, the IT office of VetUK, the UK head office of AlphaGraphics, the accelerated mass spectrometry specialists Xceleron Ltd, and the Leeds, York & North Yorkshire Chamber of Commerce. The Science Park is also home to some parts of the School of Physics, Engineering and Technology. The Department of Electronic Engineering's Recording studios are located in the park and in summer 2011, the Department of Physics moved its Plasma Physics and Fusion Group to the Genesis buildings in the Science Park at the newly created York Plasma Institute, and moved its Physics of Life group to the Science Park in winter 2019. York Conferences are located on the university campus.

Other properties
The university owns several other properties including Catherine House, Constantine House, 54 Walmgate, and Fairfax House. The university publishes an annual code of practice for student accommodation to help students living off-campus.

Organisation and administration

Colleges

York is a collegiate university and has eleven colleges. All colleges have equal status, and each has its own constitution. The day-to-day running of the colleges is managed by an elected committee of staff and student members chaired by the college's Provost. Most colleges have a Junior Common Room for undergraduate students, which is managed by the elected Junior Common Room Committee, and a Graduate Common Room for postgraduate students, as well as a Senior Common Room, which is managed by elected representatives of the college's academic and administrative members. Other colleges however combine undergraduate and postgraduate representation together into student associations. The colleges are deliberately assigned undergraduates, postgraduate students and staff from a wide mixture of disciplines. The Sunday Times noted, "The colleges are tight-knit communities within the university and enjoy a healthy rivalry." The colleges share practical features of the halls of residence of other UK universities, as well as the traditional Oxbridge and Durham colleges. The university is building two new colleges on Campus East, opening in 2021 and 2022. The ninth college was founded in 2014 and was named Constantine after the Roman emperor Constantine I, who was proclaimed Augustus in York in 306 AD. The tenth was founded in 2021 and named after Anne Lister. The eleventh was founded in 2022 and named after David Kato.

Academic departments

The university hosts a number of interdisciplinary research centres, including the Borthwick Institute for Archives, Centre for Renaissance and Early Modern Studies, the Centre for Eighteenth-Century Studies, the Centre for Modern Studies, the Centre for Medieval Studies, the Institute for Effective Education and the Institute for the Public Understanding of the Past. The Department of Politics hosts the Post-war Reconstruction and Development Unit and the Centre for Applied Human Rights.

Campus West hosts the National Science Learning Centre which opened in March 2006, it serves as the hub for a £51 million national network of centres dedicated to revitalising science teaching in schools. It is operated by the White Rose University Consortium (which comprises the Universities of Leeds, Sheffield and York) together with Sheffield Hallam University.

 Department of Archaeology
 Department of Biology
 Department of Chemistry
 Department of Computer Science
 Department of Economics and Related Studies
 Department of Education
 Department of Electronic Engineering
 Department of English and Related Literature
 Department of Environment and Geography
 Department of Health Sciences
 Department of History
 Department of History of Art
 Department of Language and Linguistic Science
 York Law School
 The York Management School
 Department of Mathematics
 Hull York Medical School
 Department of Music
 Department of Philosophy
 Department of Physics
 Department of Politics
 School of Philosophy, Politics and Economics
 Department of Psychology
 School of Social and Political Sciences
 Department of Social Policy and Social Work
 Department of Sociology
 Department of Theatre, Film, Television and Interactive Media

Governance

List of chancellors

 George Lascelles, 7th Earl of Harewood (1962–1967)
 Kenneth Clark, Baron Clark (1967–1978)
 Michael Swann, Baron Swann (1979–1990)
 Dame Janet Baker (1991–2004)
 Greg Dyke (2004–2015)
 Sir Malcolm Grant (2015–2022)
 Dr Heather Melville, OBE (2022–)

List of vice-chancellors
 Eric James, Baron James of Rusholme (1962–1973)
 Morris Carstairs (1973–1978)
 Berrick Saul (1979–1993)
 Ron Cooke (1993–2002)
 Brian Cantor (2002–2013)
 Jane Grenville, acting (2013)
 Koen Lamberts (2014–2018)
 Saul Tendler, acting (2018–2019)
Charlie Jeffery (2019–present)

University of York Music Press 
University of York Music Press (UYMP) was founded in 1995 by David Blake with Bill Colleran. UYMP maintains online catalogues for composers and their music. At present, there are a total of twenty-seven house composers and thirty-one associate composers. UYMP has so far published more than one thousand projects in twelve sections. Among the composers whose music is published by UYMP are David Blake and Anthony Gilbert.

Academic profile

Rankings and reputation

QS placed York at 162 for 2023. and the Times Higher Education ranking for 2023 was 139=. All three major national rankings place York in the top 21, with The Times placing it at 17, The Guardian at 21 and The Complete University Guide at 20 for 2023.

In The Sunday Times 10-year (1998–2007) average ranking of British universities based on consistent league table performance, York was ranked 6th overall in the UK. In 2000, the Sutton Trust named York as a leading university in the United Kingdom, placing it 6th overall.

On 25 November 2010 York was named "University of the Year" at the Times Higher Education Awards, achieving praise from the judges for its "success in combining academic excellence with social inclusion, as well as its record in scientific discovery". In 2014 York was named the eighth best university under 50 years old in the world, and first within the United Kingdom.

In the Times Higher Education rankings York is listed as 34th for Life Sciences & Biomedicine in 2015. In 2018 CWTS Leiden recorded there to have been 2833 publications by York between 2013 and 2016 which placed it at 425 in the world by quantity and 128 in terms of its proportion of top 10% publications.
Overall world rankings for York by ARWU placed it between 401 and 500 for 2021. In the 2022 Shanghai Academic Ranking of World Universities the top-ranked research disciplines at York were sociology (49th), atmospheric science and economics (both ranked in the range 51–75).

Admissions and enrolment

Information for entry standards gathered from the 2014/15 academic year by the HESA shows that the average student at the University of York achieved a UCAS Tariff of 430, the 19th highest in the UK. An A grade at A-Level is equivalent to 120 points, and an A at AS worth 60 points, the average entrant can be assumed to achieve ABB at A Level and AB at AS Level since most applicants take 5 AS Levels and specialise to 3 A Levels. York, along with only a handful of other British universities, require the new A* grade for some course entry requirements. The university gives offers of admission to 78.5% of its applicants, the joint 15th lowest amongst the Russell Group.

There are around 6.2 applications for every undergraduate place, and a completion rate of 93.2% with around 80% of graduates graduating with a First/2:1.

17.9% of York's undergraduates are privately educated, the joint 20th highest proportion amongst mainstream British universities. In the 2016–17 academic year, the university had a domicile breakdown of 80:5:16 of UK:EU:non-EU students respectively with a female to male ratio of 56:44.

Student activities

Representation

The students' union is the University of York Students' Union and is referred to as YUSU. Its membership is currently the entire student population of the university. In 2008 YUSU was able to open its first Union-run licensed venue The Courtyard. In addition to the students' union, there is the Graduate Students' Association (GSA) the Students' Union for postgraduate students, which follows normal SU functions such as representing postgraduates on university committees and Council.

Each College has its own JCRC or students' association which provide a variety of services, including college events and student welfare services; they also organise the Freshers' Fortnight activities in their College.

Non-partisan political societies are well represented at the university, with the York Student Think Tank – which produces research in collaboration with national policy organisations such as IPPR, New Generation Society – an informal debating society, and The York Union Society – which competes in inter-varsity debating tournaments against other universities. There are also very active party political societies on campus with the University of York Labour Club, the University of York Liberal Democrat Society, the University of York Conservative and Unionist Association and the University of York Green group; campaigning on issues both on and off campus, as well as organising debates and talks by high-profile speakers. There is also a branch of People and Planet, which campaigns on environmental and ethical issues.

Provisions for lesbian, gay, bisexual, trans and queer (LGBT) students at the university are divided among two distinct organisations. YUSU LGBTQ+ is a liberation network built into the students' union, which represents LGBTQ+ students by campaigning for issues on campus, offering welfare & support and running events for all LGBTQ+ students to attend, such as cabaret evenings and chilled mixers. The LGBTQ Social Society also organises social events aimed at LGBTQ+ students and their friends. While remaining separate, these two groups generally have strong links to each other as well as links from the student network to the Staff LGBTI+ Matters Forum, which offers largely similar provision to staff members of the university.

Student Union bars and venues

The University's Students' Union run a number of bars and venues across both campuses, namely The Courtyard, The Kitchen, The Glasshouse, The Lounge and Vanbrugh Arms. Additionally, the Union also ran a venue known as D-Bar (located in Derwent College) but had to temporarily close it due to the Covid-19 pandemic. D-Bar later reopened as a cafe during refurbishments of Derwent, before fully reopening in 2022. Shortly after reopening as a bar, D-Bar was hosting an LGBTQ+ event when it was gate crashed by Derwent College Rugby team which was called out by the then-LGBTQ+ Officers, Matt Rogan and Daniel Loyd.

In 2020, Patrick O'Donnell, the president of YUSU, unveiled a new, purpose built venue named The Forest which would be used for a wide variety of events. Later that year, Brian Terry, the then Student Activities Officer, had the venue used as part of a week long Freshers Fair, advertising societies and clubs to students in a Covid-safe environment.

In 2021, The Lakeside Tap was opened. It has since been permanently closed.

Media

York Student Television (YSTV) was founded at the university in 1967 and is England's oldest student television station. YSTV once held the world record for longest continuous television broadcast under a single director. It was named the best student television station at the 2012, 2014 and 2019 NaSTA Awards. The University of York Filmmaking Society was a student-run filmmaking group; between 1999 and 2014 its members made two feature films and many shorts, some of which were shown at national film festivals.

University Radio York (URY) is the oldest independent radio station in the United Kingdom and winner of the Student Radio Awards Best Station Award 2020.

Nouse was established in 1964 and was 2005 NUS/Mirror Student paper of the year and 2009 NUS Best Student Media. It has also won multiple Guardian Student Newspaper awards throughout the past decade, for both its pioneering website and outstanding individual journalists. Its rival newspaper, Vision, was named Guardian Student Newspaper of the Year for three consecutive years between 2002 and 2004—the only time this has occurred in the 27-year history of the prestigious awards—and won it again in 2007. In 2011, it won the award for a fifth time, making it the most awarded student newspaper in the United Kingdom. It also won Best Small Budget Publication at the 2006 NUS/Mirror National Student Media Awards.

The Lemon Press, York's satire magazine, was launched in 2009, in both print and online formats. In 2010 it won the NUS Award for Best Student Media. The Yorker is an online publication set up by students as an independent company in 2007; it was nominated for the Guardian Student media awards after running for only a few months.

York Student Cinema (YSC), operating since the late 1960s, show around 30 films a term using a professional 35 mm projector, an industry standard Christie CP2000 digital projector, and a full size CinemaScope screen in one of the largest rooms on campus. It has won the BFFS film society of the year award several times and celebrated its 50th anniversary in 2016.

In 2019, the History of Art department began publishing Aspectus, an annual research journal edited by current postgraduates within the department.

Sports
The university teams play in black-and-gold colours. York is a member of British Universities and Colleges Sport (BUCS) and has 65 teams participating. At the end of the 2013/14 BUCS season York came 38th out of 145 participating institutions.

As well as BUCS every summer term the university take part in the Roses Tournament, a sports competition against Lancaster University, which is the largest inter-university tournament in Europe. The venue of the event alternates each year between York and Lancaster, and involves numerous sports clubs, including the conventional (football, hockey) and the more unusual (octopush, ultimate frisbee).  York are leading Lancaster with 27 wins to 26, with one draw in 1974.

The university has also previously also been in the White Rose Varsity Tournament, this started in 2005 against York's other university York St John, York won all six of the tournaments held. In 2011 attempts to try and increase the competitiveness of the competition resulted in York St John being replaced by the University of Hull. York won all 3 tournaments against Hull, which resulted in it being scrapped in 2013.

In 2014 a new tournament was created "College Varsity" which was held between the Colleges of the University of York and the Colleges of Durham University.

Arts

The University of York Music Society and the University of York Drama Society are two of the largest student societies on campus; with each having performances and/or concerts every week during term. Central Hall Musical Society performs a number of shows and showcases every year.

Other performing societies include the Gilbert and Sullivan Society, PantSoc who stage a student-written pantomime three times a year, and York ComedySoc, one of the most active comedy societies in the UK, putting on a show every week along with workshops in stand-up, improv and sketch writing/acting. ComedySoc sends two shows to the Edinburgh Fringe each year: The Shambles, ComedySoc's in-house improv comedy troupe and The Dead Ducks, ComedySoc's in-house sketch comedy troupe. Both troupes perform throughout the year on campus and in/around York and have received critical acclaim for their shows at the Edinburgh Fringe.

Long Boi
Long Boi is an Indian Runner-Mallard Duck cross that lives in Derwent College, and has become an unofficial mascot to the university. In 2022 a student campaign to erect a 1:1 scale statue of Longboi due to his 'cultural significance' and 'contribution to student life'. In response, the union president said that he would explore possible options to construct a statue.

FUSION 
Fusion was recently founded to promote the ever-growing urban music scene and to raise money for charity.

In 2004 a student at the university established York Carnival—a day celebrating music and the arts in the centre of York. Its original aim was to encourage links between the University of York and the residents of the historic city and to encourage participation in the arts. It has grown into a large annual event, attracting crowds of up to 5,000.

Notable alumni and academics

York has a large number of alumni who have been active in politics, including at least fifteen Members of the United Kingdom Parliament, five members of the House of Lords, two Members of the Scottish Parliament, one Member of the European Parliament and several ministers of other governments around the world. The former President and former Prime Minister of Portugal Aníbal Cavaco Silva, completed his doctorate in economics at York. The incumbent Governor-General of Belize Colville Young holds a doctorate in linguistics from York. The Senior Vice President of the World Bank Group Dr Mahmoud Mohieldin holds a master's degree in Economic and Social Policy Analysis from York.

The university is also represented by alumni educated in the liberal arts such as English literature, social sciences, economics, philosophy, medieval history, and music. The author Anthony Horowitz attended York and graduated in 1973 with a degree in English literature and art history. Greg Dyke, Chair of the Football Association and British Film Institute, is a former student, and graduated in 1974 with a BA in Politics, returning to York as university Chancellor from 2004 to 2015. Writer, critic and broadcaster, Victor Lewis-Smith, studied music in the late 1970s. The current Director of the Natural History Museum, Sir Michael Dixon, has a PhD in Zoology from York.

More recently, due to expansion into areas of technology, it has also produced notable computer scientists, such as the Ethereum co-founder Gavin Wood, computer scientist Chris Lilley, and computational biologist Sue Jones.

Prominent academics associated with the University of York include the distinguished literary teacher F. R. Leavis and anti-apartheid activist Adrian Leftwich, and York doctorate, Professor Jennifer Smith (sociolinguist), FRSE, now at the University of Glasgow studying Scottish dialects.

Notes

See also
Armorial of UK universities
List of UK universities
Plate glass university
White Rose Theatre, theatre company originating at the university
York College, further education college in York 
York St John University, another university in York

References

External links

 

 
1963 establishments in England
Buildings and structures in York
Educational institutions established in 1963
York
York